Lian Junjie (born 3 November 2000) is a Chinese diver. He won the gold medal of Mixed synchronized 10-metre platform with Ren Qian in 2017 World Aquatics Championships and with Si Yajie in 2018 FINA Diving World Cup.

References

External links

2000 births
Living people
Chinese male divers
People from Wuzhou
Sportspeople from Guangxi
Divers at the 2018 Summer Youth Olympics
World Aquatics Championships medalists in diving
21st-century Chinese people